Turbo sparverius, common name the corded turban, is a species of sea snail, marine gastropod mollusk in the family Turbinidae.

The Australian Faunal Directory considers this species as a synonym of Turbo setosus Gmelin, 1791

Description

The shell grows to a length of 75 mm. The solid, imperforate shell has an ovate- conic shape. Its color pattern is dirty white or greenish, maculate or tessellate with dark. The six whorls are convex, rounded, more or less angular around the upper part. They contain inconspicuous incremental striae and revolving lirae, which on the body whorl are wide and flattened with narrow interstices and are obsolete around the axis. The aperture measures over half the length of shell. It is white within, oval, angular above and below. The peristome is scarcely crenulated and is frequently greenish. The columella contains a heavy white callus, dilated and effuse at its base.

Distribution

This marine species occurs in the southwest Pacific and off the Philippines.

References

 Gmelin J.F. 1791. Caroli a Linné. Systema Naturae per regna tria naturae, secundum classes, ordines, genera, species, cum characteribus, differentiis, synonymis, locis. Lipsiae : Georg. Emanuel. Beer Vermes. Vol. 1(Part 6) pp. 3021-3910
 Trew, A., 1984. The Melvill-Tomlin Collection. Part 30. Trochacea. Handlists of the Molluscan Collections in the Department of Zoology, National Museum of Wales.
 Alf A. & Kreipl K. (2003). A Conchological Iconography: The Family Turbinidae, Subfamily Turbininae, Genus Turbo. Conchbooks, Hackenheim Germany. 
 Williams, S.T. (2007). Origins and diversification of Indo-West Pacific marine fauna: evolutionary history and biogeography of turban shells (Gastropoda, Turbinidae).'' Biological Journal of the Linnean Society, 2007, 92, 573–592.

External links
 

sparverius
Molluscs of the Pacific Ocean
Molluscs of the Philippines
Marine fauna of Southeast Asia
Taxa named by Johann Friedrich Gmelin
Gastropods described in 1791